Herman Lindqvist may refer to:
 Herman Lindqvist (politician) (1863–1932), Swedish Social Democratic politician and trade union organizer
 Herman Lindqvist (journalist) (born 1943), Swedish journalist and author